WMVB (1440 AM) is a radio station broadcasting a Variety format. Licensed to Millville, New Jersey, United States, the station is currently owned by Martin Muniz and features Hispanic programming.

The station is a mostly local operation; the only syndicated program heard on the station is Jim Bohannon's America in the Morning news magazine. Local news and information is featured prominently on the station, including local talk, farm reports, religious programming, locally originated brokered programming, and a selection of niche music programs on weekends.

WMVB was formerly owned and operated by Richard Arsenault and Anita Arsenault between 1994 and 2000.

From 1980 to 1999, WMVB utilized the call letters WREY "Radio REY" and broadcast primarily Spanish language programming. WMVB originally signed on in 1953 as WMLV and shortly thereafter adopted the current WMVB callsign, which are believed to represent Millville, Vineland and Bridgeton, the three largest cities in Cumberland County, New Jersey.

References

External links

Cumberland County, New Jersey
MVB
Mainstream adult contemporary radio stations in the United States